Ekeberghallen, also known as Ekeberg idrettshall, is an indoor sports arena located at Ekebergsletta in the neighborhood of Ekeberg in the Nordstrand district of  Oslo, Norway. Ekebergsletta is part of the Oslo park system and is used primarily for sporting events.

History
Ekeberghallen was opened in 1973 and expanded in 1981 when adjacent office localities named Osloidrettens Hus were opened as well. The court size is 46 × 75 meters, and the audience capacity is 4800.
The facility is divided into  badminton courts,   handball courts,  tennis courts,  volleyball courts and is fully equipped for athletics. It has   wardrobes, sound system, stage / table and chairs for alternative use. It is used, among other things, in connection with the Norway Cup.

The hall is owned by Oslo Idrettskrets. It is mainly used by Bækkelagets Sportsklub and other sports clubs in the city, for indoor sports such as basketball, handball, volleyball, badminton, indoor athletics and futsal. On weekends without demand from sports, the hall is rented out for other purposes such as exhibitions, concerts, conferences and meetings. 
 It has also been used as a professional boxing venue.

References

Ekeberg
Sports venues in Oslo
Buildings and structures in Oslo
Indoor arenas in Norway
Indoor track and field venues in Norway
Music venues in Oslo
Sports venues completed in 1973
1973 establishments in Norway
Boxing venues in Norway
Basketball venues in Norway
Volleyball venues in Norway
Handball venues in Norway